Clethodim is an organic compound.  A member of the cyclohexanedione family of herbicides, it is used to control grasses, especially Lolium rigidum. Although impure samples appear yellowish, the compound is colorlesss.

References

Hydroxylamines
Ketones
Imines
Herbicides